"Work" is a song by London-based musical duo the 2 Bears. It was released as a single on 1 January 2012 as a digital download in the United Kingdom. The song is from their debut studio album Be Strong.

Music video
A music video to accompany the release of "Work" was uploaded to YouTube on 12 January 2012 at a total length of three minutes and fourteen seconds.

Track listing
 Digital download
 "Work" (Radio Edit) - 3:10
 "Work" - 4:12
 "Work" (Oliver $ Remix) -5:28
 "Work" (Toddla T Remix)[feat. Trim, Scrufizzer & Trigganom] - 3:29
 "Work" (Supabeatz Remix) - 5:01
 "Work" (Franky Rizardo Remix) - 6:18

Chart performance

Release history

References

2011 songs
2012 singles
The 2 Bears songs